The Presbyterian Mission Church  in Las Vegas, New Mexico is a historic church at 1413 Chavez Street.  It was built during 1871-73 and was added to the National Register of Historic Places in 1978.

It is located three blocks south of the historic Las Vegas plaza.  It is a  adobe brick building covered with adobe plaster.

See also

National Register of Historic Places listings in San Miguel County, New Mexico

References

Churches completed in 1873
Churches in Las Vegas, New Mexico
Presbyterian churches in New Mexico
Churches on the National Register of Historic Places in New Mexico
National Register of Historic Places in San Miguel County, New Mexico